This list of botanical gardens and arboretums in California is intended to include all significant botanical gardens and arboretums in the U.S. state of California.

See also
List of botanical gardens and arboretums in the United States
Gardens in California

References 

 
 
Botanical gardens
Botanical gardens
Botanical gardens
Botanical gardens
Botanical gardens
Botanical gardens